Frissen is a surname. Notable people with the surname include:

Jerry Frissen (born 1964), American comic book writer and toy designer
Jos Frissen (1892–1982), Dutch painter
Léon Frissen (born 1950), Dutch politician
Valerie Frissen (born 1960), Dutch academic